Hickinbottom is a surname. It is a corruption of Oakenbottom, a place in Bolton-le-Moors, probably influenced by the dialect word hickin or higgin, the mountain ash.

Notable people with the surname include:

Ernest Hickinbottom (1865–1939), English footballer
Wilfred Hickinbottom (1896–1979), English chemist
Gary Hickinbottom (born 1955), British judge
Geoffrey Hickinbottom (born 1932), English cricketer
Rob Hickinbottom (born 1967), Regional Head of Intelligence, British National Crime Agency

See also
Higginbottom

References